Hypolophota is a genus of snout moths. It was described by Alfred Jefferis Turner in 1904.

Species
 Hypolophota amydrastis Turner, 1904
 Hypolophota oodes Turner, 1904

References

Tirathabini
Pyralidae genera